Daroga Prasad Saroj (born 1 January 1956) in Mohanpur Patwans, Azamgarh (Uttar Pradesh)  is an Indian politician for the Lalganj (Lok Sabha Constituency) in Uttar Pradesh.

References

External links
 Official biographical sketch in Parliament of India website

1956 births
Living people
Politicians from Azamgarh district
People from Azamgarh
India MPs 2004–2009
Samajwadi Party politicians
Lok Sabha members from Uttar Pradesh
Samata Party politicians
India MPs 1998–1999
Bharatiya Janata Party politicians from Uttar Pradesh
Samajwadi Party politicians from Uttar Pradesh